A Beautiful New World is a 1999 Chinese comedy film directed by Shi Runjiu. The film, Shi's first (he had previously served as an assistant director for Lu Yue's Mr. Zhao), was co-produced by Xi'an Film Studio and the independent Imar Film Company. It was Imar Film's second production, after 1997's Spicy Love Soup.

Set in Shanghai, the film stars Jiang Wu and Tao Hong as a mismatched pair. Taiwanese pop stars Richie Jen and Wu Bai are cast in minor roles.

Cast
Jiang Wu as Zhang Baogen, a country boy, who upon winning the lottery, heads to Shanghai to claim his prize, a new apartment.
Tao Hong as Huang Jinfang, Baogen's debt ridden city cousin, who apprehensively offers up her home to her distant country relative. 
Chen Ning as Chen Minghui, Jinfang's best friend.
Richie Jen as Bai, Minghui's boyfriend.
Wu Bai as Liang, a street musician, who befriends Baogen.
Tong Zhengwei as Auntie Cai, Jinfang's elderly neighbor.
Cheng Lei (cameo)
Niu Ben (cameo)

Reception
Derek Elley of Variety praised the film as "a beautifully played, accessible pic that rewrites the rule book on mainland Chinese cinema."

Awards and nominations
1999 Beijing College Student Film Festival
Won — Best Actress (Tao Hong)
1999 Hawaii International Film Festival
Won — Special Jury Award (Jiang Wu)

References

External links 
 
 
 A Beautiful New World at the Chinese Movie Database

1999 films
1999 comedy films
1990s Mandarin-language films
Films set in Shanghai
Films shot in Shanghai
1999 directorial debut films
Chinese comedy films